Cabaniss is an unincorporated community in Monroe County, in the U.S. state of Georgia.

History
A post office called Cabaniss was established in 1872, and remained in operation until 1904. The community was named in honor of E. G. Cabaniss, a local judge.

References

Unincorporated communities in Monroe County, Georgia